Club Deportivo Troya was a Honduran football club based in Tegucigalpa, Honduras.

History
Founded in 1949 by Carlos Padilla Velásquez, they played in first division in 1965–66, 1966–67, 1971–72, 1972–73 and 1973–74

Achievements
Segunda División
Winners (1): 1970–71

League performance

 The 1972–73 season was canceled after nine rounds.

References

Defunct football clubs in Honduras
Association football clubs established in 1949
1949 establishments in Honduras